Vanadium (V) chloride chlorimide is a chemical compound containing vanadium in a +5 oxidation state bound to three chlorine atoms and with a double bond to a chlorimide group (=NCl). It has formula VNCl4. This can be also considered as a chloroiminato complex.

Production
Vanadium(V) chloride chlorimide can be made by chlorinating vanadium nitride at 120°. Or chlorine azide can react with vanadium tetrachloride to yield it. Or more conveniently it can be made by heating vanadium tetrachloride with sodium azide and chlorine gas.

Properties
The melting point of Vanadium(V) chloride chlorimide is 136 °C. It can be sublimed in a vacuum below its melting point. The density of the solid is 2.48. The solid has a triclinic crystal structure with unit cell a=7.64, b=7.14, c=5.91 Å; α=112.4°, β=94.9°, γ=107.8° with Z=2 (formulas per unit cell). The space group is P.

Vanadium(V) chloride chlorimide is molecular. In the gas phase the V to N bond length is 1.651 Å, V to Cl bond length is 2.138 Å, N to Cl bond length is 1.597 Å. The bond angles are ∠ClVCl 113.4°, VNCl 169.7 and ∠NVCl 106.0.

In the solid form, the bond lengths are slightly different. V-Cl: 2.20, 2.30 and 2.38 Å, V=N bond is 1.64 Å long and N-Cl length is 1.59 Å. The VNC angle is 175.2°.

Reactions
VCl3NCl can crystallise with antimony pentachloride. Phosphines and nitrogen bases can form complexes with the vanadium in this compound. (triphenyl phosphine, tributyl phosphine, pyridine, bipyridine). A reaction with ammonium chloride yields the [Cl5VNCl]2− ion.

References

Chlorimides
Vanadium(V) compounds